Glade Run is a tributary of the West Branch Susquehanna River in Northumberland County and Lycoming County, in Pennsylvania, in the United States. The stream is not designated as an impaired waterbody. An Indian path known as the Wyoming Path was historically in the stream's vicinity. More recently, a number of bridges have been constructed over Glade Run. The stream's watershed is designated as a Warmwater Fishery and a Migratory Fishery.

Course

Glade Run begins in a valley in Lewis Township, Northumberland County. It flows northeast for several tenths of a mile before turning north and exiting Lewis Township and Northumberland County. Upon exiting Northumberland County, the stream enters Muncy Creek Township, Lycoming County. It continues flowing north for several tenths of a mile before receiving an unnamed tributary from the right and turning northwest. After a short distance, the stream turns north again for a few tenths of a mile, receiving an unnamed tributary from the left before turning west and receiving another unnamed tributary from the right. It then turns west-southwest for several tenths of a mile before turning west for a few tenths of a mile. The stream then receives an unnamed tributary from the left and turns north-northeast for several tenths of a mile. It then turns northwest for a few miles, leaving its valley, crossing Interstate 180, receiving two unnamed tributaries from the left, and entering Muncy. In Muncy, it flows north-northwest for several tenths of a mile before turning northwest and reentering Muncy Creek Township. It then gradually turns south-southwest. After several tenths of a mile, the stream turns northeast before turning west-southwest for a few tenths of a mile. It then reaches its confluence with the West Branch Susquehanna River.

Glade Run joins the West Branch Susquehanna River  upriver of its mouth.

Hydrology
Glade Run is not designated as an impaired waterbody.

The peak annual discharge of Glade Run at its mouth has a 10 percent chance of reaching . It has a 2 percent chance of reaching  and a 1 percent chance of reaching . The peak annual discharge has a 0.2 percent chance of reaching .

Geography and geology

Watershed and recreation
The mouth of the stream is in the United States Geological Survey quadrangle of Muncy. However, its source is in the quadrangle of Hughesville. The mouth of the stream is located within  of Muncy.

The designated use for Glade Run is aquatic life. A potential impoundment site on the stream was considered by the Lycoming County Planning Commission in 1969. It would have had an area of  if constructed.

History
Glade Run was entered into the Geographic Names Information System on August 2, 1979. Its identifier in the Geographic Names Information System is 1175663. Glade Run received its name from the glades through which it flowed along its course.

An Indian path known as the Wyoming Path historically ran alongside Glade Run for part of its length. In 1771, shortly after John Scudder settled on Glade Run, his daughter Mary Scudder became the first white child to be born in what is now Lycoming County. In the early 1900s, a 3-million-gallon (11,356-cubic-meter) reservoir in the watershed of Glade Run was used as a water supply by the Muncy Water Supply Company for the borough of Muncy.

A concrete tee beam bridge carrying Pennsylvania Route 405 over Glade Run was built in Muncy in 1919. In 1920, a concrete slab bridge carrying Carpenter Street over the stream was built, also in Muncy, as was a concrete stringer/multi-beam or girder bridge carrying Green Street. A concrete slab bridge carrying Mechanic Street over Glade Run was built in 1938, again in Muncy. A concrete tee beam bridge carrying State Route 2061 was constructed across the stream in 1962 near Muncy. A prestressed box beam or girders bridge carrying State Route 2044 across the stream was built in 1974.

Biology
The drainage basin of Glade Run is designated as a Warmwater Fishery and a Migratory Fishery.

See also
Turkey Run (West Branch Susquehanna River), next tributary of the West Branch Susquehanna River going downriver
Muncy Creek, next tributary of the West Branch Susquehanna River going upriver
List of rivers of Pennsylvania

References

Rivers of Northumberland County, Pennsylvania
Rivers of Lycoming County, Pennsylvania
Rivers of Pennsylvania